Sköldinge is a locality situated in Katrineholm Municipality, Södermanland County, Sweden with 604 inhabitants in 2010.
From 1866 to 1967, Sköldinge was home to the active Kantorp iron mine.

Riksdag elections

References 

Populated places in Södermanland County
Populated places in Katrineholm Municipality